Hilgen is a defunct American amplifier manufacturer.

Company information
The company was started in the 1960s in Hillside, NJ. The name "Hilgen" is a combination of "Hillside" and "Gentul." Jack Gentul (1920–2000) was the founding innovator behind the Hilgen products. 
The company made both guitar and bass models, with a T indicating a guitar model and a B indicating a bass model.

Amplifier models

Guitar Amplifiers
 T1506 Troubador 12" combo amp. Featured 12AX7 and 12AU7 preamp tubes, 2 EL84 power tubes, and a 5Y3GT rectifier.
 T2511 Meteor 12" combo amp. There is mention on the Univox website that the Hilgen Meteor may have been a different brand name used by Univox to sell their U-45B 10W 12" combo amp  with similar circuitry and slightly different cosmetics.
 R2523 Champion. Introduced in 1965, featured 7591A tubes, reverb and tremolo. 
 There was a model called the "Swing Away", which was a semi-combo 2x12. Its unique feature was that the amp was hinged, allowing it to be tucked away in the speaker cabinet when not in use; it could then swing into position when needed.
 R2522 Victor - Similar in appearance to other Hilgen combo amps though this model has a crest in the lower right corner.  single 12" speaker.  tubes: 5AR4 GZ34 rectifier, 7199 for reverb recovery, 2 x 12AX7s for preamp and reverb send, 12AU7 phase inverter.  25 to 30 watt output. 
 R2521 Pacesetter - similar in appearance to other Hilgen combo amps.  swirling paint design on grill cloth similar to those found on Sano amps.  12" speaker powered by 7591 power tubes

Bass Amplifiers
 B2501 Basso, a 1x15 combo amp. Came with 2 7591A, 1 5AR4(GZ34) rectifier, and 2 12AX7As one for the preamp and one for the phase inverter for about 20-25 watts although I have heard of some having 3 12AX7's. But by today's wattage ratings is actually closer to 40 watts. Info and schematics at http://www.hilgenamplifiers.net/ 
(I have the amplifier section only from a B2501 Basso - it has 2x 7591A, 5AR4, but only 2x 12AX7. I have traced out the circuit, and could make it available - where to post it?) ( In Hand Confirmation (2 11 2012) on 2x 12ax7 only on this amp, not 3 as listed above.)
 B2502 Basso Profundo, a 1x15 combo amp
 B2503 Basso Grande, an amp head designed to piggyback on top of a speaker cabinet. Came with 2 12AX7 preamp tubes, 2 7591A power tubes, and a 5AR4(GZ34) rectifier. It came with a closed-back 2-12 speaker cabinet that had a unique, slightly angled profile. The head attached to the top of the speaker cabinet with a pair of latches.
B2234 HM-B, a 1x15 combo amp, also with 2 12ax7 preamp tubes, 2 7591 power tubes, and a 5AR4(GZ34) rectifier.

References

External links
http://www.ampeg.com
https://web.archive.org/web/20070623121344/http://www.univox.org/
http://reviews.harmony-central.com/reviews/Guitar+Amp/brand/Hilgen
https://web.archive.org/web/20070929043352/http://www.stevenfenner.com/Music/Univox/Univox.htm

Audio equipment manufacturers of the United States
Guitar amplifier manufacturers